Attak is the twelfth studio album by German industrial band KMFDM, released on March 19, 2002 by Metropolis Records. The band's first album following a three-year hiatus, it was the first to feature member Lucia Cifarelli and the last to feature member Tim Sköld.

History
The album was originally going to be titled Attaq and written in a Middle Eastern font, but was changed by Konietzko after the September 11 attacks, who explained that the band's history with the Columbine shootings would have made the original title "pretty fucking harsh".

Reception

Attak received mixed reviews.

Track listing

Personnel
Sascha Konietzko – drums (1–7, 9, 10), programming (1–11), synthesizers (1–6, 10), vocals (1–8, 10, 11), bass (3–7, 9, 10), guitars (3, 4, 6, 7, 11), percussion (5), cockpit voice recorder (6)
Tim Sköld – guitars (1, 2, 5, 8, 10), bass (2, 8, 10), drums (2, 8, 10), programming (2, 5, 8, 10), synthesizers (2, 5, 8, 10), vocals (2, 5, 8, 10), percussion (5), drumloops (9)
Bill Rieflin – drums (1, 5, 11), bass (1, 11), programming (3, 5), synthesizers (3, 5, 11), percussion (5, 11), guitars (11)
Lucia Cifarelli – vocals (1, 4–7, 11), Sidstation "Ninja" (4)
Jules Hodgson – guitars (3, 9)
Raymond Watts – vocals (3, 6, 9), drumloops (9)
Arianne Schreiber – vocals (3)
Curt Golden – slide guitars (11)
Dorona Alberti – vocals (11)

References

External links
 KMFDM DØTKØM Attak lyrics at the official KMFDM website

KMFDM albums
2002 albums
Metropolis Records albums
Albums produced by Sascha Konietzko